Vitarelli is an Italian surname. Notable people with the surname include:

 Alicia Vitarelli, news anchor
 Cory Vitarelli, lacrosse player
 William Vitarelli, educator and architect

See also
 Joe Viterelli, actor

References

Italian-language surnames